Scoloparia is an extinct genus of procolophonid parareptile from the Triassic of Canada. Fossils have been found in the Early Triassic to Norian-age Wolfville Formation in Nova Scotia, Canada. Like many Triassic procolophonids, Scoloparia has expanded molar-like teeth that indicate that the animal was likely herbivorous.

References

Leptopleuronines
Triassic parareptiles
Fossils of Canada
Paleontology in Nova Scotia
Prehistoric reptile genera